The 1998 Environmental Policy and Conflict Resolution Act (P.L. 105-156) created the U.S. Institute for Environmental Conflict Resolution to assist parties in resolving environmental conflicts around the country that involve federal agencies or interests. The Institute provides a neutral place inside the federal government but "outside the Beltway" where public  and private interests can reach common ground. Its primary objectives are to:

Resolve federal environmental, natural resources, and public lands disputes in a timely and constructive manner through assisted negotiation and mediation.
Increase the appropriate use of environmental conflict resolution (ECR) in general and improve the ability of federal agencies and other interested parties to engage in ECR effectively.
Engage in and promote collaborative problem-solving and consensus-building during the design and implementation of federal environmental policies to prevent and reduce the incidence of future environmental disputes.

See also 
Morris K. Udall Foundation
Conflict resolution

Footnotes

Sources 
CSU Center for Collaborative Policy - Collaborative Process Resources
http://www.epa.gov/fedrgstr/EPA-IMPACT/2001/June/Day-26/i15970.htm
 Fourth National Environmental Conflict Resolution Conference (Sponsors)
Using Environmental Conflict Resolution in Natural Resource Damage Assessments 
Programs of the Udall Foundation

Environmental organizations based in the United States